Diplomeris is a genus of flowering plants from the orchid family, Orchidaceae. It is native to China, the Indian subcontinent, and southeast Asia. Three species are currently recognized (June 2014):

Diplomeris hirsuta (Lindl.) Lindl. - India, Nepal, Bhutan, Assam, China
Diplomeris josephi A.N.Rao & Swamin. - Arunachal Pradesh
Diplomeris pulchella D.Don - India, Nepal, Bhutan, Assam, Myanmar, Thailand, Vietnam, Tibet, Guizhou, Sichuan, Yunnan

See also 
 List of Orchidaceae genera

References 

Pridgeon, A.M., Cribb, P.J., Chase, M.A. & Rasmussen, F. eds. (1999). Genera Orchidacearum 1. Oxford Univ. Press.
Pridgeon, A.M., Cribb, P.J., Chase, M.A. & Rasmussen, F. eds. (2001). Genera Orchidacearum 2. Oxford Univ. Press.
Pridgeon, A.M., Cribb, P.J., Chase, M.A. & Rasmussen, F. eds. (2003). Genera Orchidacearum 3. Oxford Univ. Press
Berg Pana, H. 2005. Handbuch der Orchideen-Namen. Dictionary of Orchid Names. Dizionario dei nomi delle orchidee. Ulmer, Stuttgart

Orchids of Asia
Orchideae genera
Orchideae